The Flowing Wells Unified School District is a unified school district headquartered at 1556 West Prince Road, Tucson, Arizona. It serves much of Flowing Wells, as well as bits of Tucson, Marana, Cortaro, Casas Adobes, & unnamed, unincorporated parts of Pima County. The district does practice open enrollment for students outside of district boundaries, provided said students maintain certain academic performance.

The school district serves some 6,000 students in ten schools. It was founded in 1889 as the Rillito School District and changed in 1928 due to an error in documentation in the Arizona School Directory. , the superintendent is Dr. Kevin Stoltzfus.

In fiscal year 2016, the district had a budget of approximately $30 million.

The district is overseen by a 5-member board that holds public meetings twice a month.

Schools

Early Childhood
 Emily Meschter Early Learning Center (Teddy Bears)

Elementary schools
 Centennial Elementary School (Coyotes)
 Homer Davis Elementary School (Dragons)
 Walter Douglas Elementary School (Bulldogs)
 J. Robert Hendricks Elementary School (Hawks)
 Laguna Elementary School (Longhorns) (originally the sole school of the since annexed Pima County School District No. 17)
 Robert S. Richardson Elementary School (Roadrunners)

Junior high school
 Flowing Wells Junior High School (Mustangs)

High schools
 Flowing Wells High School (Caballeros)
 Sentinel Peak High School (Scorpions)

See also

 Flowing Wells Witch Trial

References

External links
 

Education in Tucson, Arizona
School districts in Pima County, Arizona
1889 establishments in Arizona Territory
School districts established in 1889